Deckert is a surname. Notable people with the surname include:

Günter Deckert (born 1940), far-right German political activist
Günter Deckert (1950–2005), East German Nordic combined skier
Josef Deckert (1843–1901), Austrian Catholic priest and anti-Semitic agitator
Manfred Deckert (born 1961), East German ski jumper
Ryan Deckert (born c. 1971), businessman and politician in Oregon, U.S.
Tempany Deckert (born 1978), Australian actress and author